Kevin Talbert is an American Democratic politician who formerly served in the Oregon Senate. After the death of Senator Alan Bates, he was unanimously selected by the Jackson County Board of Commissioners on August 30, 2016 to fill Bates' seat. He did not run in the 2016 general election.

Talbert served on the General Services Committee and Veteran's Service Committee.

Talbert unsuccessfully ran for Jackson County Commissioner in 2014.

References

External links
 

Living people
Date of birth missing (living people)
Place of birth missing (living people)
Democratic Party Oregon state senators
Politicians from Ashland, Oregon
21st-century American politicians
Year of birth missing (living people)